Italo Dell’Oro, CRS (born June 20, 1953) is an Italian prelate of the Roman Catholic Church who has been serving as auxiliary bishop for the Archdiocese of Galveston-Houston in Texas since 2021.

Biography

Early life 
Italo Dell’Oro was born on June 20, 1953, in Malgrate, in the province of Lecco, Italy. His parents were Guiseppe Dell'Oro and Silene (Crippa) Dell'Oro. He has two sisters, Michela and Edvige (Edy). His first cousin is Bishop Adelio Dell'Oro of the Diocese of Karaganda in Kazakhstan.

In 1978, Dell'Oro entered the Somascan Fathers seminary in Rome, making his first profession to the congregation.  He took his solemn vows to the Somascan Fathers in 1981. and received his Bachelor of Sacred Theology degree in 1982 from the Pontifical Athenaeum of Saint Anselm in Rome

Priesthood 
On September 11, 1982, Dell’Oro was ordained to the priesthood for the Diocese of Como at the Santuario Del Santissimo Crocifisso in Como, Italy by Bishop Teresio Ferraroni of the Archdiocese of Milan.

Three years after his ordination, Dell'Oro came to the United States to work as a priest assistant at Pine Haven Boys Center in Allenstown, New Hampshire, a school for troubled children operated by the Somascan Fathers.  In 1988, he received a Master of Arts degree counseling and psychotherapy from Rivier University in Nashua, New Hampshire.

In 1992, Dell'Oro was transferred to Houston,Texas, where he became pastor at Assumption Parish in that city.  After eight years as Assumption, he was appointed dean of the Northeast Deanery in Houston.  This was followed in 2001 by his appointment as vocations director at the Somascan Fathers House of Formation in Houston. Dell'Oro was  appointed director of ministry to priests for the archdiocese in 2005, a position he would hold for the next ten years.  In 2014, he was elevated to formation director. In 2015, Dell'Oro became vicar for clergy and the secretariat director for clergy formation and chaplaincy services. He was named vicar general in 2021.

Auxiliary Bishop of Galveston-Houston 
Pope Francis appointed Dell’Oro as auxiliary bishop for the Archdiocese of Galveston-Houston on May 18, 2021. On July 2, 2021, he was consecrated by Cardinal Daniel DiNardo. Archbishop Franco Moscone was to serve as a co-consecrator but could not travel from Italy to the United States to attend due to the COVID-19 pandemic travel restrictions. Bishop Brendan J. Cahill served instead as co-consecrator.

See also

 Catholic Church hierarchy
 Catholic Church in the United States
 Historical list of the Catholic bishops of the United States
 List of Catholic bishops of the United States
 Lists of patriarchs, archbishops, and bishops

References

External links
Roman Catholic Archdiocese of Galveston-Houston Official Site

Episcopal succession

 

1953 births
Living people
People from the Province of Lecco
Bishops appointed by Pope Francis